Coelolepis is an extinct genus of jawless fish of the Silurian.

See also 
 List of prehistoric jawless fish genera
 List of thelodont genera

References

External links 
 

Thelodonti genera
Silurian jawless fish